"Heavy Metal (Takin' a Ride)" is a song by Eagles guitarist Don Felder with backing vocals from Timothy B. Schmit and Don Henley. It is the theme song of the animated film Heavy Metal, not to be confused with the song of the same title by Sammy Hagar, also included on the same movie soundtrack. The B-side, "All of You", is also a track on the movie's soundtrack album.

"Heavy Metal" was Felder's only solo chart hit. The song charted in the United States, reaching No. 43 on the Billboard Hot 100 and number 42 on Cash Box. It spent four months on the pop charts.  On the Mainstream Rock chart, "Heavy Metal (Takin' a Ride)" peaked at number five.

Personnel
Don Felder - vocals, guitar
Timothy B. Schmit - bass, backing vocals
Don Henley - drums, backing vocals

Chart history

References

Film theme songs
Animated series theme songs
1981 songs
1981 singles
Asylum Records singles
Songs written for films